Coarse Money Creek is a stream in Southeast Fairbanks Census Area, Alaska, in the United States.

Prospectors likely coined the name Coarse Money Creek which was recorded by the United States Geological Survey in 1916.

See also
 List of rivers of Alaska

References

Rivers of Southeast Fairbanks Census Area, Alaska
Rivers of Alaska
Rivers of Unorganized Borough, Alaska